Farrell Flat (formerly Hanson) is a town in South Australia. At the 2006 census, Farrell Flat and the surrounding area had a population of 294.

Once the heart of a thriving farming community, Farrell Flat today is largely a satellite town to the larger towns nearby. It has retained its own identity, with a functioning hotel, cafe and meeting house, engineering business and grain silos.

The town was surveyed as Hanson in 1870 and did not officially become Farrell Flat until 19 September 1940. The name Farrell's Flat had been in use for some time, this being the name of the railway station. The nearby town of Davies was officially renamed to Hanson on 19 September 1940.

Farrell Flat was named for Colonial Chaplain and Dean of Adelaide, James Farrell (26 November 1803 – 26 April 1869).

See also
 Stanley Football Association

Gallery

References

Towns in South Australia